Sorawit Panthong (born 20 February 1997) is a Thai professional footballer who plays as a midfielder for Thai League 1 club Police Tero.

Honours
Muangthong United
 Thai League 1
  Champions (1) : 2016

References

1997 births
Living people
Sorawit Panthong
Sorawit Panthong
Association football midfielders
Sorawit Panthong
Sorawit Panthong
Sorawit Panthong
Sorawit Panthong